Richard Chatham Atkinson (born March 19, 1929) is an American professor of psychology and cognitive science and an academic administrator. He is president emeritus of the University of California system, former chancellor of the University of California, San Diego, and former director of the National Science Foundation.

Biography

Career 
Atkinson began his academic career during the 1960s as a professor of psychology at Stanford University, where he worked with Patrick Suppes on experiments to use computers for teaching math and reading to young children in Palo Alto elementary schools. The Education Program for Gifted Youth at Stanford is a descendant of those early experiments.

In 1975, Atkinson's career transitioned from research to administration when he was appointed as Director of the National Science Foundation. He later served as Chancellor of the University of California San Diego, and President of the University of California system.

Atkinson is widely recognized for his scientific, academic, and administrative accomplishments. He has been elected to the National Academy of Sciences, the National Academy of Medicine, the National Academy of Education (NAEd), the American Academy of Arts and Sciences and the American Philosophical Society. He is past president of the American Association for the Advancement of Science, former chair of the Association of American Universities and the recipient of many honorary degrees. Named in his honor are a mountain in Antarctica, and Atkinson Hall, the home of the California Institute for Telecommunications and Information Technology at UC San Diego.

Research 
After earning his bachelor's degree at the University of Chicago and his Ph.D. in experimental psychology and mathematics at Indiana University Bloomington, Atkinson joined the faculty at Stanford University in 1956. Except for a three-year interval at UCLA, he served as professor of psychology at Stanford from 1956 to 1975.  His research on mathematical models of human memory and cognition led to additional appointments in the School of Engineering, the School of Education, the Applied Mathematics and Statistics Laboratories, and the Institute for Mathematical Studies in the Social Sciences. 

The theory of human memory which Atkinson put forward with his student Richard Shiffrin has been influential in shaping research in the field of human memory. The theory is generally referred to as the “modal model of memory” or the “Atkinson-Shiffrin Theory”. Their 1968 article, “Human Memory: A Proposed System and Its Control Processes”, is one of the most highly cited in the behavioral and cognitive sciences.  In 2019, the journal Memory and Cognition devoted a special issue in recognition of five decades of research inspired by the theory.

In 1977, he received the American Psychological Association’s Distinguished Scientific Contribution Award.

National Science Foundation 
Atkinson was nominated by U.S. President Jimmy Carter to be director of the National Science Foundation (1975–1980). Among his achievements was the negotiation of the first memorandum of understanding between the People’s Republic of China and the United States, an agreement for the exchange of scientists and scholars. It became part of a more comprehensive agreement on science and technology between China and the United States signed by Chair Deng Xiaoping and President Jimmy Carter in January 1979.

Convinced that building a closer relationship between industry and research universities was crucial to the future of American science, Atkinson took a series of steps that have had far-reaching
consequences: (1) Established the NSF Industry-University Cooperative Research Program at a time when collaborative research between private companies and universities, now widely accepted, was
rare. (2) Initiated a special program at NSF to fund research on the relationship between investments in research and economic growth, an early contribution to the field of economics called “new growth theory.” (3) Elevated engineering to a full directorate at NSF. (4) Advocated with the Congress for legislation that gave companies a tax credit for investing in their own research and for supporting university research. (5) Initiated a series of policy studies that led to the 1980 Bayh–Dole Act, which transferred intellectual property rights in federally sponsored research from the U.S. government to universities.

During Atkinson’s tenure at the NSF, skeptics in both Congress and the media mounted frequent attacks on government funding for basic research as little more than subsidizing idle curiosity about trivial topics at the taxpayers’ expense. This trend was aptly symbolized by Senator William Proxmire’s Golden Fleece Awards for waste and fraud in public programs, several of which were awarded to NSF.  As NSF director, Atkinson defended basic research, the value of which Senator Proxmire ultimately acknowledged. He promoted the long-term importance of fundamental intellectual inquiry and led the NSF in conducting some of the early studies on the contributions of basic research to productivity and economic growth.

UC San Diego
Atkinson was chancellor of the University of California San Diego from 1980–1995, where he instituted a major administrative reorganization of the campus and began a sustained effort to strengthen UC San Diego's ties with the city of San Diego. This highly successful effort yielded important dividends in the form of financial and community support. Private donations rose from $15 million to nearly $50 million annually during his chancellorship. Despite a series of tight budgets in the late 1980s, he found innovative ways to fund the construction of new buildings and to support new academic programs. Its 1982 election to the prestigious Association of American Universities, consisting of the nation's top research universities, reflected UCSD's increasing academic status. Atkinson's tenure was marked by the campus's steady growth in size and distinction. UC San Diego's faculty expanded by nearly 50 percent and enrollment doubled to about 18,000 students. In 1995, the quality of its graduate programs was ranked tenth in the nation by the National Research Council.

During his years at UC San Diego, Atkinson encouraged technology transfer and active involvement with industry; especially with small, high-technology companies, such as Bien Logic, that were forming around San Diego in the 1980s and 1990s. In 1985, the UC San Diego Extension began running the self-sustaining UCSD CONNECT program. It was successful in helping aspiring entrepreneurs in high-technology fields find information, funding, and practical support for crucial projects such as business plan development, marketing, and attracting capital. It was an advocate on public policy issues that affected business. UC San Diego's outstanding faculty, innovative research, and commitment to industry-university partnerships were major factors in transforming the San Diego region into a world leader in technology-based industries. Atkinson's role in this transformation was noted in a recent study of research universities and their impact on the genesis of high-technology centers.

University of California 
Atkinson became the University of California’s seventeenth president in October 1995. His principal goal was sustaining the excellence of UC’s faculty, recognized in several national studies of academic program quality. An equally important challenge was accommodating an enrollment increase of 63,000 undergraduate students, about forty percent, between 1998 and 2010. UC Merced, the University’s first new campus in forty years, was founded during Atkinson’s presidency.

He sought to expand the University’s contributions to California’s productivity and economic growth through the efforts of programs such as the two described next. The Industry-University Cooperative Research Program aided this growth by supporting collaborative research in areas critical to the state’s economic competitiveness. Proposed by California Governor Gray Davis and established at four UC campuses, The California Institutes for Science and Innovation worked to creating the next generation of knowledge in high-technology fields through interdisciplinary research partnerships with industry.
 
Atkinson’s most important task as president resulted from the July 1995 decision by the UC Board of Regents to eliminate racial preferences in admission. Under his guidance, UC embarked on an ambitious partnership with the K-12 public schools to raise the level of academic accomplishment among all California children. Within UC, the Academic Senate and the Regents approved his proposals for several new paths to undergraduate admission that moved UC's selection process closer to the comprehensive review of students’ records used by selective private universities. By the end of his tenure, UC was admitting more minority students than it was in 1997, the year before the ban on affirmative action took effect.

Under Atkinson's leadership, the University adopted a new academic freedom policy that clearly defined the central role of the faculty in protecting and promoting the freedom to teach, research, and express ideas in the modern research university. He established the California Digital Library to expand access to UC's collections of information and to advance new forms of scholarly communication. UC established several new professional schools and began expanding its graduate enrollment. Enrollment in engineering and computer science, disciplines essential to the high-tech California economy, rose by nearly 70 percent and total UC enrollment increased by a third, from 150,000 to 202,000 students. The University prospered during Atkinson's tenure. For the first time, private donations reached the billion-dollar mark in a single year, UC's state-funded budget nearly doubled, and federal research funds soared.

Personal life 
Atkinson is married to Rita, a psychologist, with whom he has one daughter, Lynn, a retired neurosurgeon. Lynn's husband is David Drucker, a pediatric surgeon, and their two children are Natalie and Adam Drucker.

Perry lawsuit 
Atkinson's early years at UCSD were rocked by a bizarre scandal when a former Harvard instructor, Lee H. Perry, represented by attorney Marvin Mitchelson, sued him in San Diego Superior Court. Perry claimed that she had an intimate relationship with Atkinson for about a year, which resulted in a pregnancy.  Although Perry wanted the baby, she stated that Atkinson persuaded her to get an abortion, promising that he would impregnate her again at a more convenient time in the next year.  After that promise had not been fulfilled, Perry decided to bring suit for intentional infliction of emotional distress, fraud, and deceit.

Atkinson denied everything. Before trial, the Superior Court granted Atkinson's motion for summary judgment on the fraud and deceit claim as initially filed, and his demurrer to the claim as amended. In 1986, the case proceeded to trial on the emotional distress claim. After three days, Atkinson settled for $250,000  without admitting liability, but Perry reserved the right to appeal on the fraud and deceit claim.

On September 25, 1987, the Court of Appeal affirmed the dismissal of that claim. The Supreme Court of California denied Perry's petition for review on January 7, 1988, which effectively ended the case.

Legacy
In February 2001, Atkinson announced he was recommending elimination of the  College Board's SAT I college entrance examination as a requirement for admission to the University of California. Students, he argued, should be tested on what they had actually achieved academically, not on the basis of “ill-defined notions of aptitude.” Atkinson’s challenge began a national debate on the relative merits of aptitude versus achievement in testing and ultimately led to a major revision of the SAT I. The new SAT I, introduced in 2005, incorporated higher-level mathematics and a written essay to reflect the quantitative and writing skills students need for success in college-level work.

As president, Atkinson had to face some of the most contentious and complex issues in American higher education, from achieving diversity to managing a multibillion-dollar budget greater than that of many states. He is remembered for his skill in guiding the University into the post-affirmative action age and for the creative and energetic leadership he brought to one of the nation's most distinguished public universities.

In 2005, the unnamed Sixth College at UCSD moved to name the college in his honor. Around April 27, 2005, UCSD students were notified that Dr. Atkinson had withdrawn his name from further consideration as the future namesake of Sixth College. The decision was an abrupt surprise as Atkinson only a week earlier had told The San Diego Union-Tribune he would be "honored if the name were approved". Although student reception to the naming proposal was lukewarm, demonstrated opposition was generally meager with only conspicuous organized criticism by opponents desiring a more racially diverse name [citation].

Selected bibliography

Chapters in books

Journal articles

References

Further reading
 “Distinguished Scientific Contribution Awards for 1977,” American Psychologist, January 1978, pp. 49–55.
 William J. McGill, “Richard C. Atkinson:  President-Elect of AAAS,” Science, Vol. 241, July 29, 1988, pp. 519–520.
 Richard C. Atkinson, “The Golden Fleece, Science Education, and US Science Policy,” Proceedings of the American Philosophical Society, Vol. 143, No, 3, September 1999, pp. 407–417.
 “Developing High-Technology Communities: San Diego,” report by Innovation Associates, Inc., for the U.S. Small Business Administration, March 2000.
 Patricia A. Pelfrey, A Brief History of the University of California, Second Edition, (Center for Studies in Higher Education and University of California Press, 2004), pp. 78–89.
 David S. Saxon, “Foreword,” The Pursuit of Knowledge: Speeches and Papers of Richard C. Atkinson, ed. Patricia A. Pelfrey (University of California Press, 2007), pp. ix-xi
 Patricia A. Pelfrey, The Entrepreneurial President: Richard Atkinson and the University of California, 1995-2003, (University of California Press, 2004).

External links

Richard C. Atkinson biography 
San Diego Reader account of Perry lawsuit
President Richard C Atkinson's Home Page with more in-depth biographical information.
Full text of Court of Appeal opinion - California Continuing Education of the Bar

1929 births
Living people
Chancellors of the University of California, San Diego
University of California, San Diego administrators
Educational psychologists
Memory researchers
Indiana University Bloomington alumni
People from San Diego
Fellows of the American Academy of Arts and Sciences
Fellows of the American Association for the Advancement of Science
Members of the United States National Academy of Sciences
Stanford University Department of Psychology faculty
University of California, Los Angeles faculty
University of California, San Diego faculty
University of Chicago alumni
University of California regents
Presidents of the University of California System
Carter administration personnel
Members of the National Academy of Medicine
American educational psychologists